Charles Cutts (January 31, 1769January 25, 1846) was an attorney and politician from New Hampshire.  Among the offices in which he served were Speaker of the New Hampshire House of Representatives, United States Senator and Secretary of the United States Senate.

Early life
Cutts was born in Portsmouth on January 31, 1769, the son of Samuel Cutts and Anna Holyoke.  He was educated in Portsmouth and Phillips Academy, Andover, MA, and attended Harvard University, from which he graduated in 1789.  During his college years, Cutts was selected for membership in Phi Beta Kappa.  After graduating, Cutts studied law with attorney John Pickering, was admitted to the bar in 1795, and practiced in Portsmouth.

Active in politics as a Federalist, Cutts was a member of the New Hampshire House of Representatives from 1803 to 1811.  He served as Speaker of the House from 1807 to 1809, and again from 1810 to 1811.

U.S. Senator
In 1810, Cutts was elected to the U.S. Senate to fill the vacancy caused by the resignation of Nahum Parker, and he served from June 21, 1810 to March 3, 1813.  Because Congressional sessions began in December, when the state legislature was not in session, Cutts completed his final New Hampshire House term and term as Speaker, which ended in early 1811.  The New Hampshire General Court failed to elect a successor for the term that began on March 4, 1813, so Governor William Plumer appointed Cutts, who served from April 2, 1813 to June 10, 1813, when a successor was elected.

While Cutts served in the Senate, the federal government was concerned with prosecuting the War of 1812 and then beginning the post-war recovery.  Cutts was appointed to several select committees concerned with the finance and the economy, foreign trade, and military defense, and frequently served as chairman.

Later life
Cutts remained in Washington, D.C. after leaving office.  In 1814 he was elected to serve as Secretary of the United States Senate, and he held the position from October 12, 1814 to December 12, 1825.  As Secretary, Cutts oversaw preparations for the Senate's move from its temporary downtown quarters in the Patent Office, which had been necessitated by the burning of the US Capitol during the War of 1812 to the hastily erected "Brick Capitol", a building which was located on the site of the current US Supreme Court Building.  Following that move, Cutts planned the move of the Senate back into the Capitol, which took place in 1819.

In retirement, Cutts moved to Fairfax County, Virginia, and eventually settled in Lewinsville.  He died in Lewinsville on January 25, 1846, and was buried in a private cemetery near Lewinsville.

Family
Cutts' mother was the daughter of Edward Holyoke and the sister of Edward Augustus Holyoke.

In 1812, Cutts married Lucy Henry Southall (d. 1868), a descendant of Patrick Henry and the niece of James Monroe's wife Elizabeth.  Their children included Stephen (b. 1813), Samuel (b. 1815), and Martha (b. 1817).  Another daughter, Priscilla Olive, died as an infant.

Charles Cutts was the cousin of Richard Cutts, who served in Congress from the portion of Massachusetts that later became the state of Maine.  Richard Cutts was the husband of Dolley Madison's sister Anna.

Attempts to locate portrait
Cutts is one of approximately 50 former senators for whom the U.S. Senate's photo historian has no likeness on file.  Attempts to locate one have proved unsuccessful.

References

Sources

Books

Internet

Newspapers

External links

1769 births
1846 deaths
Harvard University alumni
Members of the New Hampshire House of Representatives
United States senators from New Hampshire
Speakers of the New Hampshire House of Representatives
Secretaries of the United States Senate
New Hampshire Democratic-Republicans
New Hampshire Federalists
Democratic-Republican Party United States senators
People of colonial New Hampshire
People from Portsmouth, New Hampshire